Alicia Barnett and Olivia Nicholls defeated Harriet Dart and Rosalie van der Hoek in the final, 5–7, 6–3, [10–1] to win the doubles tennis title at the 2022 Championnats de Granby.

Haruka Kaji and Junri Namigata were the reigning champions from 2019, when the tournament was an ITF tournament, but their rankings did not qualify them to participate this year.

Seeds

Draw

Draw

References

External links
Main draw

Championnats Banque Nationale de Granby - Doubles